Seán Fleming (born 27 February 1958) is an Irish Fianna Fáil politician who has served as Minister of State at the Department of Foreign Affairs since December 2022. He previously served as Minister of State at the Department of Finance from July 2020 to December 2022. He has been a Teachta Dála (TD) for the Laois–Offaly constituency since 2020, and previously from 1997 to 2016 and from 2016 to 2020 for the Laois constituency. He previously served as Chair of the Public Accounts Committee from 2016 to 2020.

Fleming is an accountant by profession. He was educated at University College Dublin. Fleming was first elected to Dáil Éireann at the 1997 general election and retained his seat at the 2002, 2007, 2011, 2016 and 2020 general elections. He was formerly Financial Director of Fianna Fáil at national level.

He was elected at the 1999 local elections as a member of Laois County Council for the Borris-in-Ossory local electoral area.

He served as Opposition Spokesperson for Public Expenditure and Reform from 2011 to 2016. He was previously the Chair of the Public Accounts Committee from 2016 to 2020.

On 15 July 2020, he was appointed as Minister of State at the Department of Finance, with special responsibility for Financial Services, Credit Unions and Insurance.

Fleming received criticism from opposition parties in February 2022 when, amid a 20 year high in inflation, he suggested that people should stop complaining about their finances, stating "[r]ather than just complaining and [asking] 'What's the Government going to do for me?', you can actually have a serious impact on your own finance, but it involves people having to do some work themselves." He later apologised for his comments.

In December 2022, he was appointed as Minister of State at the Department of Foreign Affairs with special responsibility for International Development and Diaspora  following the appointment of Leo Varadkar as Taoiseach.

References

External links
Seán Fleming's page on the Fianna Fáil website

1958 births
Living people
Alumni of University College Dublin
Fianna Fáil TDs
Local councillors in County Laois
Members of the 28th Dáil
Members of the 29th Dáil
Members of the 30th Dáil
Members of the 31st Dáil
Members of the 32nd Dáil
Members of the 33rd Dáil
Politicians from County Laois
Ministers of State of the 33rd Dáil